New England Island is an uninhabited island in Essex, England.  One road crosses the island, connecting it with bridges to Foulness and to the mainland via Havengore Island.

Formerly used as pasture for sheep, the low-lying island is protected by levees and has been owned by the Ministry of Defence since 1915.

External links 

Islands of Essex
Uninhabited islands of England
Rochford District